Michael James 'George “Elbows” McFadden' Crotty (September 16, 1874 – August 30, 1948) was a lightweight boxer, active between 1894 and 1908. Though never a champion himself, during his career he met three of the division’s greatest fighters, Joe Gans, who he defeated (K.O. 23rd round), Frank Erne, who he lost to in a 25 round decision and George “Kid” Lavigne, who he also defeated (K.O. 19th Round), were all world champions at some point in their careers.

“Elbows” 
The moniker of Elbows was bestowed upon McFadden for two reasons:

 he used his knobby joints to defend himself with the efficiency of a stone wall;
 if he could not hit an opponent with his gloved fist, he did it with his elbows

McFadden’s favorite trick was to start a roundhouse with either hand towards the jaw, ostensibly missing as his glove swished harmlessly past his opponent’s chin. His elbow, however, did not miss. It would crack flush onto the mouth with a squishing of lips and a smashing of teeth. This set up the poor innocent for a follow up punch with the other glove – and this was the punch that often ended the fight. So crafty was McFadden in employing this manoeuvre that referees often missed seeing it, or couldn’t prove it if they did.

In his latter years, before he died, McFadden freely admitted using the tactic.

“It won me,” smiled the aging McFadden genially, “a lot of fights”.

New York Journal sportswriter and cartoonist Thomas A. Dorgan agreed.

“McFadden should use four gloves in the ring,” he said, “One on each fist and one on each elbow!”

Another favourite tactic of McFadden, who was certainly not afraid of fouling, was to heel an opponent with the open glove.

Boxing career 
The use of these somewhat nefarious strategies is to take nothing away from McFadden the boxer, however. With or without his elbows, McFadden was one of the truly great fighters of his era, an era which spawned many of the great fistic giants in gloved boxing.

Of his 97 recorded bouts, McFadden won 45, lost 12, and drew 21, with 25 of his victories coming by way of knockout. McFadden also engaged in at least fifty other contests that were not recorded.

A Champion in any other era

McFadden was such a good fighter that if he had been of another era he might well have been champion. But he made the crucial mistake of being born during the age of three of the most phenomenal lightweights ever to lace on a glove: Joe Gans, Frank Erne, and Kid Lavigne.

Within a period of six months between April and October, 1899, McFadden took on all three of these great champions, knocking two of them out (Gans and former champ Lavigne), and coming close to beating the third (Erne) in his first title fight.

McFadden’s finest win was the first in this series, and came when he took on, and defeated Gans (whom he fought seven times), on April 14, 1899, winning by way of a 23rd-round knockout. Gans (“The Old Master”) was favoured four-to-one in the betting, and up to that point had never been knocked out in his career. He had gone eight years unbeaten until that evening, when a terrific McFadden left hook to the body followed by a short right to the chin brought him crashing face down to the canvas.

In a time when boxing champions sometimes made less money than a good plumber, McFadden was back at work the day after his greatest victory, refusing to answer the questions of sports reporters until after working hours, lest his boss should catch him and have him fired.

Post-boxing Career

After he retired in 1908, McFadden opened a gymnasium in Manhattan, where he catered to financial lights such as the Morgans, Goulds, Whitneys and others. It is estimated that during the course of a single day, the ownership of half of New York passed through the posh portals of Elbows’ gym.

An entrepreneur, as late as 1938, at age 66, McFadden was selling a course on “How to Increase Your Height” at his gymnasium.

McFadden died on August 30, 1948, at the age of 73, while traveling from Buffalo, New York, to Michigan. He was struck by a trailer, suffered two broken legs and multiple fractures from the accident. He was taken to Geneva Community Hospital where he shortly after died from those injuries. He was survived by 8 daughters and sons.

External links
 
 https://www.findagrave.com/memorial/185005127/michael-james-crotty (obituary)

References
 https://www.findagrave.com/memorial/185005127/michael-james-crotty (obituary)

Brannigan, J 1962, 'Tell Me About Elbows McFadden', Boxing Illustrated, February 1962 (Vol. 4 No. 2),  p. 44-45

Gilbey, JF 1993, Western boxing and world wrestling, North Atlantic Books, Berkeley, California

Lightweight boxers
American sports businesspeople
1874 births
1951 deaths
Place of birth missing
American male boxers